Ust-Kachka is a rural locality (a selo) and the administrative center of Ust-Kachkinskoye Rural Settlement, Permsky District, Perm Krai, Russia. The population was4,098 as of 2010. There are 59 streets.

Geography 
Ust-Kachka is located 50 km west of Perm (the district's administrative centre) by road. Krasny Voskhod is the nearest rural locality.

References 

Rural localities in Permsky District